Maryland's Legislative District 29 is one of 47 districts in the state for the Maryland General Assembly. It covers parts of Calvert County and St. Mary's County. The district is divided into three sub-districts for the Maryland House of Delegates: District 29A, District 29B and District 29C.

Demographic characteristics
As of the 2020 United States census, the district had a population of 135,519, of whom 103,220 (76.2%) were of voting age. The racial makeup of the district was 97,907 (72.2%) White, 19,595 (14.5%) African American, 517 (0.4%) Native American, 3,690 (2.7%) Asian, 117 (0.1%) Pacific Islander, 2,568 (1.9%) from some other race, and 11,146 (8.2%) from two or more races. Hispanic or Latino of any race were 7,556 (5.6%) of the population.

The district had 89,345 registered voters as of October 17, 2020, of whom 18,988 (21.3%) were registered as unaffiliated, 36,733 (41.1%) were registered as Republicans, 32,210 (36.1%) were registered as Democrats, and 738 (0.8%) were registered to other parties.

Political representation
The district is represented for the 2023–2027 legislative term in the State Senate by Jack Bailey (R) and in the House of Delegates by Matt Morgan (R, District 29A), Brian M. Crosby (D, District 29B) and Todd Morgan (R, District 29C).

References

Calvert County, Maryland
St. Mary's County, Maryland
29